George Cortez (born February 11, 1951) is a gridiron football coach who has spent most of his coaching career with in the Canadian Football League (CFL). He was notably the head coach for the Hamilton Tiger-Cats during the 2012 season. He attended Texas A&M University.

Coaching career
Cortez's coaching career began in 1979 where he was the offensive line coach for the Rice Owls of Rice University. He began his CFL coaching career with the Montreal Concordes in 1984 as the running backs coach. He later served as an assistant coach for the Ottawa Rough Riders, Calgary Stampeders, Saskatchewan Roughriders, and BC Lions. He was hired as the head coach for the Hamilton Tiger-Cats in 2012, but was fired after a 6-12 finish.

Cortez was hired as the running backs coach for the Calgary Stampeders for the 2020 season, which was eventually cancelled, and was not retained for 2021 due to the new league-imposed salary cap.

Head coaching record

References

1951 births
Living people
Buffalo Bills coaches
BC Lions coaches
Calgary Stampeders coaches
Hamilton Tiger-Cats coaches
Lamar Cardinals football coaches
Montreal Alouettes coaches
Ottawa Rough Riders coaches
Rice Owls football coaches
Saskatchewan Roughriders coaches
SMU Mustangs football coaches
Texas A&M University alumni
Sportspeople from Port Arthur, Texas